Vasile Caciureac (born 19 October 1962 in Sighetu Marmației, Romania) is a Romanian former football striker. He played for several Divizia A teams, including Rapid București, FCM Braşov, Petrolul Ploieşti, FC Baia Mare and the defunct Victoria București.

Career

Born in Sighetu Marmației, he was raised in Crăciuneşti village, Maramureș County. When he was 18, he made his league debut, playing for Second Division team CIL Sighetu Marmației. In 1981, he returned to Baia Mare, where he played football at a youth level for Club Sportiv Şcolar, signing with FC Baia Mare.

After playing the Romanian Cup final in FC Baia Mare's shirt, lost against Dinamo București, he returned to Sighet. After one season, he moved to Steaua CFR Cluj, but his team relegated in the Third League. His third spell at CIL Sighetu Marmației was a good one, and his team won the promotion back to Divizia B.

In the second part of the season, he was loaned to FC Baia Mare, making his debut in the first league (Divizia A), but he returned to play for the fourth time at Sighet. In 1986, he was sold to Victoria București, a top-flight team, and he played Divizia A football 8 years in a row after that, finishing two times on the third place.

After spells at Petrolul Ploieşti and FCM Braşov, he returned to Bucharest, playing for FC Rapid. He soon earned a place in the Rapid starting eleven, playing three seasons and a half for them. After a short period of time spent at Rocar București, he moved to Lebanon, where he played for Sagesse Beirut and Tadamon Sour.

In 2002, he returned to Liga III's Aversa București as manager, and retired as a player.

Personal life

He is married to former long jumper Vali Ionescu. Both of them have represented Rapid București. They have two children: a boy, Sergiu, and a girl, Alexandra.

References

1962 births
Living people
People from Sighetu Marmației
Romanian footballers
Romanian expatriate footballers
CS Minaur Baia Mare (football) players
Association football forwards
Expatriate footballers in Lebanon
Liga I players
FC Rapid București players
AFC Rocar București players
Romanian expatriate sportspeople in Lebanon
Tadamon Sour SC players
Sagesse SC footballers
Lebanese Premier League players